Lady Death is a fictional goddess appearing in American comic books published by Coffin Comics. Created by Brian Pulido, Lady Death first appeared in Evil Ernie #1 in December 1991.

Lady Death then reappeared in the Evil Ernie: The Resurrection miniseries published by Pulido under his now-defunct company Chaos! Comics in 1994. The character was also the subject of a full-length animated feature film released in July 2004 by ADV Films.

Incarnations of the character have been illustrated by such comic book artists as Steven Hughes, Mike Deodato, Jr., Romano Molenaar, Dheeraj Verma and Ivan Reis. Brian Pulido has optioned publishing licenses through various independent companies such as Avatar Press. , Lady Death was published by Pulido's Coffin Comics, LLC.

In addition, Lady Death has been depicted in artworks by a number of well-known fantasy artists such as Dorian Cleavenger, Gerald Brom, Boris Vallejo, Joe Jusko and Julie Bell.

Publication history
Lady Death was originally published by Chaos Comics and remains one of the best examples of the bad girl titles that took the American comic book industry by storm during the late 1990s. The earliest issues of Lady Death were written by Brian Pulido and illustrated by Steven Hughes. Lady Death was originally conceived as a violent anti-hero, but subsequent iterations have toned down the more controversial aspects of the character.

In August 2002, Chaos! Comics filed for Chapter 7 bankruptcy and the intellectual property rights to Lady Death were sold to CrossGen Entertainment. Pulido continued to work on Lady Death for Crossgen, creating a new series titled Medieval Lady Death that was released in February 2003. This version of Lady Death made substantial changes to the character in an attempt to capture a larger mainstream audience.

Despite Medieval Lady Death enjoying reasonable sales, CrossGen Entertainment ran into financial difficulties of its own and filed for Chapter 11 bankruptcy on June 18, 2004, in Tampa, Florida. During the bankruptcy proceedings, the rights to Lady Death were sold to Avatar Press. The other Chaos! Comics properties were sold to Tales of Wonder.

In 2004, a feature-length animated motion picture based upon the original version of Lady Death was released. Produced by ADV films, the Lady Death animated feature premiered at Comic-Con International in San Diego on July 23, 2004. The film was poorly received and was not a major financial success.

In July 2005, Avatar Press unveiled a new version of Lady Death. Both Medieval Lady Death as well as the Classic Lady Death were published in separate series. Pulido wrote both series, which featured art by several Avatar Press artists, including Juan Jose Ryp, Daniel HDR, Richard Ortiz, Ron Adrian, Di Amorin and Gabriel Guzman.

In 2010, Avatar Press created a separate imprint, Boundless, to publish new comics starring the character later that year. Pulido and Mike Wolfer wrote the ongoing series.

In 2015, Pulido launched new Lady Death stories via Kickstarter and later in April 2016, Pulido began publishing new stories under his company Coffin Comics, LLC.

Fictional character biography

The first Lady Death
Lady Death originated as a hallucination by a troubled boy named Ernest "Ernie" Fairchild. Ernie believed Lady Death was his dream girl: a violent, sexy supervillain. She promised to "love Ernie forever" in exchange for his loyalty and a vow to kill everyone on Earth. Initially, Lady Death's appearances in Ernie's stories were that of a muse and confidant. Eventually it is revealed that she is her own demonic entity. Her true intentions and her past remained a mystery. As Ernie's story progressed, Lady Death moved on and led her own.

Classic Lady Death
The setting for the original Lady Death comic was medieval Sweden. The woman who would become Lady Death was born a mortal named Hope. Her father was a local nobleman named Matthias who was despised by the peasants as a cruel tyrant for forcibly conscripting peasants into military service as feudal levies. The exact nature of the war that Matthias was prosecuting is not specified, although evidence from the recent revision of the character by Avatar Press suggests that it may have been one of the Northern Crusades (also known as the Baltic Crusades).

Unknown to his innocent daughter, Matthias had a dark secret. Although congratulated by the Church for his work against the pagans and was outwardly pious, Matthias was secretly dabbled in black magic and demonology. He was actually a descendant of the fallen angels who had led the rebellion against God. By contrast, Hope's mother was a woman so pure and innocent that her bloodline reached Heaven. Hope's mother died when Hope was still in her late teens, and she was left to live with her father.

Eventually, Matthias' cruelty triggered a peasant uprising. Matthias narrowly escaped death at the hands of the rebels by summoning a demon, but Hope was captured by the rebels and accused of witchcraft. Faced with the prospect of execution by burning at the stake, Hope uttered an incantation that she had overheard her father use. This incantation summoned a demon who offered her a bargain – he would rescue her from death if she would renounce her humanity and serve the powers of Hell. Hope accepted the bargain and was transported into the infernal realms.

Once in Hell, Hope became entangled in a civil war that was raging between Lucifer and an army of renegade devils led by a powerful sorcerer. Hope was devastated when she learned that the ambitious sorcerer challenging Lucifer for the control of Hell was her own father.

Gradually corrupted by the nature of her surrounding, Hope was tainted with evil. She allied herself with an exiled craftsman who forged weapons for the infernal armies. While speaking to him, she declared that the innocent woman she had once been was dead and that she would henceforth only be known as Lady Death.

In her new persona, Lady Death led an uprising against the Lords of Hell. During the final battle, Lucifer cursed her never to return to Earth while the living walked. Lady Death swore an oath that she would circumvent Lucifer's curse by exterminating all life on Earth.

Lady Death finally ended Lucifer's control over her by casting him through Heaven's Gate (a place where evil cannot go), and in doing so became the new ruler of Hell. Many of the beings living in hell believe that the ascension of Lady Death signaled the beginning of the age of judgment – the final battle between good and evil for the fate of the Earth.

Classic Lady Death at Avatar Press
Avatar Press began publishing Lady Death titles in 2005. Since they only have the rights to Lady Death alone, and not the rest of the Chaos! Comics characters that were intertwined with her original story, Lady Death has been given a new origin story, with notable differences to the story told at Chaos! Comics.

Hope is the daughter of Mary and Marius. Marius is a crusader who has been waging endless campaigns against the pagans, always returning with only his most loyal soldiers, while the peasant levies were slaughtered. This angered the survivors.

Hope, realising that her father has changed and is no longer the man he once was, follows him into the dungeons, with her mother close behind. The townsfolk meanwhile batter down the gates and invade the castle, intent on revenge. Hope discovers her father summoning dark wraiths, and sacrificing the souls of countless peasants in exchange for a kingdom in The Labyrinth. The wraiths refer to her father as Sagos.

Sagos grabs hold of Mary, revealing that he has possessed Marius' body, and they disappear through the portal, leaving Hope behind. Cheated of their revenge, the villagers decide to burn Hope at the stake as a witch. Not wishing to die, Hope casts the spell she overheard her father cast, and summons the wraiths herself. The wraiths agree to transport her through the portal, if she forsakes her humanity and pledges her soul to The Labyrinth. Hope passes through the portal, her skin and hair turning albino in the process (the mark of all those who willingly choose to pass through the portal), and finds herself in the Blacklands.

There she encounters Wargoth, who observes her uncontrolled and instinctive use of magic, and agrees to help her destroy Sagos and rescue her mother. He recruits the sorceress Satasha to teach Hope spellcraft. Wargoth also teaches her how to fight, but every weapon she wields melts in her hand due to her uncontrolled energy.

Over the next two years, Lady Death and her companions fight through the Blacklands, hunting for Sagos. All the while Sagos' undead army destroys and converts the cities of the Blacklands. Eventually, Lady Death and her companions track Sagos down to a temple in Karrion, where they discover Sagos holding Lady Death's mother in chains. Sagos defeats them easily and brings the temple down around them. Lady Death digs herself out and is attacked by Nameless Wolves, slaying all but two of them. These two wolves become her companions.

In the city of Asuwa, Lady Death recovers the sword Deathbringer, which was specially made for her by Satasha and The Silent One. Deathbringer is able to withstand her energies without being destroyed, and allows her to channel her magic through it.

Lady Death then bathes in the Fanghorn river, which grants knowledge of elemental magic to those who survive the experience. She uses this power to save Satasha's home city from destruction, but learns that Sagos does not plan to just conquer the Blacklands, but to wipe out all life, and that he has the means to do it.

Lady Death comic series

Chaos! Comics
Series published by Chaos! Comics include:

 The Reckoning 1994
 Lady Death Swimsuit Special 1994 (pin-up edition)
 Lady Death in Lingerie (1995 pin-up edition with various artists)
 Between Heaven & Hell 1995
 Chaos Quarterly 1 1995
 Chaos Quarterly 2 1996
 Chaos Quarterly 3 1996
 The Odyssey 1996
 The Crucible 1996
 Death Becomes Her 1997
 Wicked Ways 1998
 The Harrowing 1998
 The Covenant 1998
 Dragon Wars 1998
 Retribution 1998
 Inferno 1999
 The Rapture 1999

 Judgement War 1999
 Armageddon 1999
 Dark Millennium 2000
 Tribulation 2000
 Love Bites 2001
 Mischief Night 2001
 River Of Fear 2001
 Alive 2001
 Last Rites 2001
 Lady Death/Chastity 2002
 Heartbreaker 2002
 Lady Death & Jade 2002
 The Gauntlet 2002
 Goddess Returns 2002
 Dark Alliance 2002 (final series from Chaos – incomplete)

CrossGen Comics
Series published at CrossGen:
A Medieval Tale (2003)
The Wild Hunt  (2004; incomplete)

Avatar Press
Note: Avatar Press publishes two versions of Lady Death: the Classic version (revamped slightly due to her separation from the Chaos! Comics universe), and Medieval Lady Death (the all-ages version from "A Medieval Tale" published at CrossGen)

 Classic Lady Death:
 Abandon All Hope 2005
 Death Goddess 2005
 The Wicked 2005
 Dead Rising (*) 2004
 Infernal Sins (*) 2006 (special art & previews of future issues)
 Lost Souls (crossover between Lady Death, War Angel, Pandora, and Unholy) 2005–2006
 Lady Death vs War Angel (sequel to Lost Souls)
 Lady Death vs Pandora (conclusion to Lost Souls trilogy)
 Lady Death / Shi
 Sacrilege 
 Annual 2006 
 Blacklands 2006–2007
 Origins Cursed 2012
 Lady Death (Boundless) 2010–2012
 Lady Death Apocalypse 2015
 2005 Bikini Special (*) 2005
 Leather & Lace (*) 2005
 Swimsuit 2005 (*) 2005
 Fetishes (*) 2006
 2007 Swimsuit Special (*) 2007
 The Art of Juan Jose Ryp (*) 2007
 Warrior Temptress (*) 2007
 Pirate Queen (*)
 (*)=To be read in no particular order.

 Medieval Lady Death:
 Medieval Lady Death 2005
 Medieval Lady Death/Belladonna 2005
 Medieval Lady Death: War of the Winds 2006–2007

Coffin Comics
Chaos Rules June 2015
Damnation Game October 2015
Extinction Express April 2016
Oblivion Kiss November 2016
Merciless Onslaught August 2017
Unholy Ruin November 2017
Apocalyptic Abyss May 2018
Nightmare Symphony September 2018
Scorched Earth June 2019
Blasphemy Anthem November 2019
Malevolent Decimation May 2020
Treacherous Infamy November 2020
Cataclysmic Majesty June 2021
Sacrificial Annihilation December 2021
Hellwitch Vs. Lady Death: Wargasm March 2022
Necrotic Genesis July 2022
Diabolical Harvest January 2023
Cybernetic Desecration August 2023

In other media

Lady Death: The Motion Picture

Lady Death: The Motion Picture was released in 2004 by ADV Films.

The movie begins in 15th century Sweden, where Hope, the beautiful daughter of Matthias, a skilled mercenary who is in actuality a demon, is accused of being the devil's consort. Sentenced by the town priest to be burned at the stake, Matthias, through his proxy, the jester Pagan, offers her life if she surrenders herself to him and joins him in Hell. Matthias's plan to corrupt her is met with unanticipated resistance, as Hope rejects his scheme and eventually finds herself transformed into the powerful warrior Lady Death, who challenges Lucifer for control of Hell itself.

Many of the events from the comics are altered in the animated film. Instead of summoning a demon with whom she bargains for her life, Hope's spell summons a pair of flying demons that carry her physically to Hell (restoring her badly burned body in the process), dropping her in the court of her father, who intends for her to join him by his side. When she refuses, he casts her out, only for her to side with the master blacksmith Cremator, an escaped slave of his, and to lead an army of hellspawn creatures against him. In this continuity, her curse is to be trapped in Hell for as long as one of Lucifer's allies remains alive. Unlike in the comic, Lady Death is presented as more of a heroine whose goal isn't to destroy all life on Earth, but to liberate Hell from Lucifer's tyranny.

Accolades
The character was ranked 39th in Comics Buyer's Guides "100 Sexiest Women in Comics" list.

See also
Purgatori, nemesis in Chaos Comics

References

External links

Lady Death Universe
Boundless Comics
 
Avatar Launches Boundless At C2E2 – Brings Back Lady Death, Bleeding Cool
Creator of Lady Death Upends Traditional Distribution Channels, Wins Big | CulturePOPcorn
Release note about Lady Death – Lost Souls 

Comics characters introduced in 1991
Avatar Press titles
Chaos! Comics titles
Chaos! Comics characters
Avatar Press characters
CrossGen titles
Fantasy comics
Fictional avatars
Fictional Swedish people
Fictional Austrian people
Fictional female martial artists
Fictional demons and devils
Fictional mass murderers
Fictional characters with albinism
Fictional queens
Fictional warlords
Comics characters who use magic
Female characters in film
Horror comics
Mythology in comics
Fictional personifications of death
American comics adapted into films
Comics adapted into animated films
Female characters in comics